In September 2016, the International Union for Conservation of Nature (IUCN) listed 670 vulnerable amphibian species. Of all evaluated amphibian species, 10% are listed as vulnerable. 
No subpopulations of amphibians have been evaluated by the IUCN.

For a species to be assessed as vulnerable to extinction the best available evidence must meet quantitative criteria set by the IUCN designed to reflect "a high risk of extinction in the wild". Endangered and critically endangered species also meet the quantitative criteria of vulnerable species, and are listed separately. See: List of endangered amphibians, List of critically endangered amphibians. Vulnerable, endangered and critically endangered species are collectively referred to as threatened species by the IUCN.

Additionally 1567 amphibian species (24% of those evaluated) are listed as data deficient, meaning there is insufficient information for a full assessment of conservation status. As these species typically have small distributions and/or populations, they are intrinsically likely to be threatened, according to the IUCN. While the category of data deficient indicates that no assessment of extinction risk has been made for the taxa, the IUCN notes that it may be appropriate to give them "the same degree of attention as threatened taxa, at least until their status can be assessed".

This is a complete list of vulnerable amphibian species evaluated by the IUCN.

Salamanders
There are 93 salamander species assessed as vulnerable.

Lungless salamanders

Asiatic salamanders

Mole salamanders

Salamandrids

Proteids
Olm (Proteus anguinus)

Torrent salamanders
Olympic torrent salamander (Rhyacotriton olympicus)

Frogs
There are 573 frog species assessed as vulnerable.

Water frogs

Robber frogs

Shrub frogs

Cryptic forest frogs

True toads

Fleshbelly frogs

Glass frogs

Batrachylids

Litter frogs

Screeching frogs

Hemiphractids

Poison dart frogs

Mantellids

Ceratobatrachids

Fork-tongued frogs

Narrow-mouthed frogs

True frogs

Australian water frogs

Puddle frogs

Hylids

African reed frogs

Other frog species

Gymnophiona

See also 
 Lists of IUCN Red List vulnerable species
 List of least concern amphibians
 List of near threatened amphibians
 List of endangered amphibians
 List of critically endangered amphibians
 List of recently extinct amphibians
 List of data deficient amphibians

References 

Amphibians
Vulnerable amphibians
Vulnerable amphibians